The 1976–77 OMJHL season was the third season of the Ontario Major Junior Hockey League (OMJHL). The St. Catharines Black Hawks moved to Niagara Falls, Ontario, becoming the Flyers. Their owner Hap Emms using the name of his former team. The Hamilton Fincups then moved to the vacant Jack Gatecliff Arena in St. Catharines, Ontario after the ice-making machine at the ancient Hamilton Forum broke down irreparably a month before the season began. Twelve teams each played 66 games. The Ottawa 67's won the J. Ross Robertson Cup, defeating the London Knights.

League business
OMJHL commissioner Tubby Schmalz filed legal action against the World Hockey Association on behalf of the OMJHL in 1976, citing failure to pay development fees for junior-aged players Paul Heaver and Bob Russell who turned professional. Schmalz also said legal action to receive payments would be likely for a third player, John Tonelli. Schmalz later announced that an OMJHL team would represent Canada at the 1977 World Junior Ice Hockey Championships, and that the league would operate a small tournament within its schedule to choose the representative.

Regular season

Standings

Scoring leaders

Playoffs

First round
Sault Ste. Marie Greyhounds defeat Peterborough Petes 3–1

Windsor Spitfires defeat Kitchener Rangers 3–0

Quarterfinals
Ottawa 67's defeat Sault Ste. Marie Greyhounds 4–0, 1 tie

Kingston Canadians defeat Sudbury Wolves 4–1, 1 tie

St. Catharines Fincups defeat Windsor Spitfires 4–2

London Knights defeat Toronto Marlboros 4–1, 1 tie

Semifinals
Ottawa 67's defeat Kingston Canadians 4–3, 1 tie

London Knights defeat St. Catharines Fincups 4–3, 1 tie

J. Ross Robertson Cup
Ottawa 67's defeat London Knights 4–2

Awards

See also
List of OHA Junior A standings
List of OHL seasons
1977 Memorial Cup
1977 NHL Entry Draft
1976 in sports
1977 in sports

References

External links
HockeyDB

Ontario Hockey League seasons
OMJHL